Archie Campbell's Cove was a Canadian fishing settlement in the "St. George District" of the province of Newfoundland and Labrador.

It was located 6 miles from Port au Port. It had a church and a school by 1911 with a population of 40.

See also
List of ghost towns in Newfoundland and Labrador

Ghost towns in Newfoundland and Labrador